Fremont C. Chamberlain (October 6, 1856 – December 4, 1931) was a member of the Michigan House of Representatives.

Biography
Chamberlain was born on October 6, 1856 in Ripon, Wisconsin. Attending Ripon College, for a dozen years he taught school in Marquette County, Michigan beginning in 1875.  In 1887, he relocated to Gogebic County, and there married Etta Bartle on February 8, 1897.

Career
After his move to Gogebic County, Chamberlain practiced law and served as supervisor, school inspector and circuit court commissioner. As a Republican, he was a member of the Michigan House of Representatives from 1893 to 1900. Being 6' 6" in height, he was referred to as the "Tall Pine of the Gogebic."  After leaving the House, he practiced law in Detroit, and in 1905 moved to New York, where he associated with the Tammany Hall political machine.  He died in Cleveland, Ohio on December 4, 1931.

References

People from Ripon, Wisconsin
Republican Party members of the Michigan House of Representatives
1856 births
1931 deaths
People from Marquette County, Wisconsin
People from Gogebic County, Michigan